A list of films produced in Argentina in 1988:

External links and references
 Argentine films of 1988 at the Internet Movie Database

1988
Argentine
Films